Minden is a ghost town in Lawrence County, Missouri, United States. It possessed a post office from 1860 to 1873.

Historical records
The Geographic Names Information System (GNIS) has an entry for "Minden School (historical)" at coordinates .

GNIS also has a listing for "Minden Post Office (historical)" with a location of unknown.

References

Unincorporated communities in Lawrence County, Missouri
1860 establishments in Missouri
Unincorporated communities in Missouri